Vile Bodies is the second novel by Evelyn Waugh, published in 1930. It satirises the bright young things, the rich young people partying in London after World War I, and the press which fed on their doings. 
The original title Bright Young Things, which Waugh changed because he thought the phrase had become too clichéd, was used in Stephen Fry's 2003 film adaptation. The eventual title appears in a comment made by the novel's narrator in reference to the characters' party-driven lifestyle: "All that succession and repetition of massed humanity... Those vile bodies...".
The book was dedicated to B. G. and D. G., Waugh's friends Bryan Guinness and his wife Diana.

Plot
Adam Symes has a novel to finish and, with the proceeds, plans to marry Nina Blount. Returning from France, his manuscript is impounded as obscene by customs officers, while in the next room his friend Agatha Runcible is strip searched as a suspected jewel thief. She rings the newspapers about her fate. Adam rings Nina to say he cannot now marry her, and has to negotiate a penal new contract with his publisher. 

Winning 1,000 pounds on a bet, Adam gives it to a drunk major to place on a horse, but the major disappears. After a fancy dress party, where he meets up with Nina and Agatha, the young people go back to the home of a quiet girl who turns out to be the Prime Minister's daughter. Agatha, who is in Hawaiian costume, is kicked out, to the delight of press photographers. The implication of orgies at 10 Downing Street causes the collapse of the government.

Nina suggests that Adam asks her widowed father in the country for money to marry on. The eccentric old man comes up with a cheque for 1,000 pounds and, in celebration, Adam takes Nina to a country hotel to claim her virginity. She claims not to have enjoyed it, pointing out also to Adam that the signature on the cheque says Charlie Chaplin.

The next big party in London is being held by Margot Metroland, whose private business is recruiting girls for Latin American brothels, and will feature an American lady evangelist with her choir of female angels. The party is crashed by Simon Balcairn, a friend of Adam's who is a gossip columnist, but Simon is kicked out and in despair gasses himself.

Simon's job is offered to Adam, who initially devotes much of his column to the exploits of his friends but finds he can only broaden the scope by invention. A dim childhood friend of Nina is transformed in dashing man-about-town Ginger Littlejohn. Still unable to marry, Nina suggests another attempt at her father. Adam finds the old man involved in the shooting of a historical film on his estate and comes away empty-handed. 

While he was away, he got Nina and other friends to write his column, for which he is sacked. With friends, Adam goes to some motor races where he sees the drunk major, who says he has got Adam's winnings but then disappears. A drunk Agatha takes off in a racing car and crashes with serious injuries, from which she later dies.

Nina announces that she is engaged to Ginger, to which the jobless and penniless Adam reluctantly agrees if Ginger pays him 100 pounds. The nuptial pair fly off to France for their honeymoon, but Ginger is unable to join Nina for Christmas at the house of her father, who he has not yet met. Adam steps into the breach, sharing a bedroom as Nina's husband and watching her father's maladroit film.

War breaks out, in which Adam finds himself alone on a devastated battlefield in France. He comes across the drunk major, now a general, who still has his winnings and invites him to champagne in his staff car. There they find one of the evangelist's angels, back in Europe after her experiences in the South American entertainment industry. While general and angel flirt, an exhausted Adam falls asleep.

Characters
Adam Fenwick-Symes, an aspiring novelist
Nina Blount, his on-and-off fiancée
Ginger Littlejohn, eventual husband of Nina
Colonel Blount, eccentric father of Nina
The Drunken Major 
Lottie Crump, owner of a private hotel, said to be based on Rosa Lewis
Agatha Runcible, wild party girl
Simon Balcairn, depressive gossip columnist
Miles Malpractice, predatory gay partygoer
Margot Metroland, society hostess and people trafficker
Mrs Melrose Ape, American evangelist, said to be based on Aimee Semple McPherson

Style
Heavily influenced by the cinema and by the disjointed style of T. S. Eliot, Vile Bodies is Waugh's most ostentatiously "modern" novel. Fragments of dialogue and rapid scene changes are held together by the dry, almost perversely unflappable narrator. 
Waugh said it was the first novel in which much of the dialogue takes place on the telephone. The book shifts in tone from light-hearted romp to bleak desolation (Waugh himself later attributed it to the breakdown of his first marriage halfway through the book's composition). Some have defended the novel's downbeat ending as a poetically just reversal of the conventions of comic romance.

Influence
David Bowie cited the novel as the primary influence on his composition of the song "Aladdin Sane".

A film adaptation, titled Bright Young Things, was released in 2003, written and directed by Stephen Fry.

References

Further reading

External links
 

1930 British novels
British novels adapted into films
Chapman & Hall books
Novels by Evelyn Waugh
Novels set in London
Novels set in the Roaring Twenties